The Environment Effects Act 1978 is current legislation that was passed in the Australian state of Victoria. It requires certain public works to have an environmental impact assessment carried out before proceeding. It was amended by the Environment Effects (Amendment) Act 2005.

It was described as flawed since it allows the Planning Minister to set terms for the assessment and to override the findings for social or economic reasons.

See also
Environment of Australia

References

External links
Text of the Act

Victoria (Australia) legislation
1978 in Australian law
1978 in the environment
1970s in Victoria (Australia)